Jaroslav Němec (born 6 March 1954) is a retired Czech footballer who played as a midfielder.

Honours

 1982–83 Czechoslovak First League

External links
 
 

1954 births
Living people
Czech footballers
Association football midfielders
Bohemians 1905 players
SK Slavia Prague players
Czechoslovakia international footballers
Czechoslovak footballers